Matthew Martin (born September 12, 1988), better known by his stage name Matt Martians, is an American record producer, illustrator, singer, and songwriter from Atlanta, Georgia. Aside from his solo career, Martians was a founding member of Los Angeles hip hop collective Odd Future and is a part of the sub-groups The Jet Age of Tomorrow with Pyramid Vritra, The Super D3Shay with Pyramid Vritra and brandUn DeShay, The Internet with Syd, and Sweaty Martians with Earl Sweatshirt.

Discography

Solo  
Studio albums 
 The Drum Chord Theory (2017) 
 The Last Party (2019) 
 Going Normal (2021) 
Butterfly Don't Visit Caterpillar (2021)

with Odd Future  
Studio albums
The OF Tape Vol. 2 (2012)
Compilations 
 12 Odd Future Songs (2011) 
Mixtapes
 The Odd Future Tape (2008)

with The Jet Age of Tomorrow  
Mixtapes 
 Voyager (2010) 
 Journey to the 5th Echelon (2010) 
 The JellyFish Mentality LP (2013) 
 God's Poop or Clouds? (2017)

with brandUn DeShay and The Jet Age of Tomorrow
Extended plays
 The Super D3Shay (2009)

with The Internet 
Studio albums
 Purple Naked Ladies (2011)
 Feel Good (2013)
 Ego Death (2015)
 Hive Mind (2018)

Extended plays
 Purple Naked Ladies: 4 Bonus Songs (2012)
 Ego Death (Bonus Tracks) (2015)

with Raleigh Ritchie and The Internet 
Extended plays
 Black and Blue Point Two (2014)

Videography

Production discography

References

1988 births
Living people
Record producers from Georgia (U.S. state)
Musicians from Atlanta
Odd Future members
American electronic musicians
Trip hop musicians
American neo soul singers